Valentin Ivanovich Yerokhin (born July 24, 1945) is a Russian professional football coach and a former player.

Yerokhin played in the Soviet First League with FC Rostselmash Rostov-on-Don, FC Torpedo Taganrog and FC Volgar Astrakhan.

External links
Profile at Footballfacts.ru

1945 births
Living people
Soviet footballers
FC Rostov players
Soviet football managers
Russian football managers
FC Ural Yekaterinburg managers
FC Volgar Astrakhan players
FC Taganrog players
Association football midfielders
FC SKA Rostov-on-Don players